the African leaffish (Polycentropsis abbreviata) is a species of African leaffish native to fresh waters of western Africa. Although placed in the family Nandidae by FishBase and by the 5th Edition of Fishes of the World many recent authorities place Polycentropsis in Polycentridae.

This species grows to a length of  TL.  It can also be found in the aquarium trade.  This species is the only known member of its genus.

References

Nandidae

Fish described in 1901